In Roman mythology, Atys  (said to have reigned 989-963 BC) was a descendant of Alba and the sixth king of Alba Longa.  Geoffrey of Monmouth asserted in his Historia Regum Britanniae that Silvius (whom he calls "Silvius Epitus") succeeded Alba at the same time that Solomon began to build the Temple in Jerusalem, and king Leil of Britain founded Carlisle.The king is thought to be the Ancestor of Atia gens.

Family tree

Notes

Kings of Alba Longa